Arthur Hugh Garfit Alston (born in West Ashby on 4 September 1902; died in Barcelona on 17 March 1958) was an English botanist. His father was a vicar and amateur naturalist who first got him interested in the field. A.H.G. Alston later received his B.A. from the University of Oxford. He went on to work at the Royal Botanic Gardens, Kew and the colonial Department of Agriculture in Ceylon. He joined the Linnean Society of London in 1927. This botanist is denoted by the author abbreviation Alston when citing a botanical name.

References 

1902 births
1958 deaths
Alumni of Lincoln College, Oxford
Botanists with author abbreviations
Fellows of the Linnean Society of London
People from East Lindsey District
20th-century British botanists
People educated at Marlborough College
British people in British Ceylon